Between Two Women is a 1986 television film starring Farrah Fawcett and Colleen Dewhurst in an emotional story about a relationship between a married woman and her mother-in-law.

Cast
 Farrah Fawcett as Val Petherton
 Colleen Dewhurst as Barbara Petherton
 Michael Nouri as Harry Petherton
 Bridgette Andersen as Kate Petherton
 Danny Corkill as Sandy Petherton
 Steven Hill as Teddy Petherton
 Terry O'Quinn as Dr. Wallace
 Kenneth Danziger as Charles
 Carmen Argenziano as Robert Walker

External links

1986 television films
1986 films
1986 drama films
ABC network original films
American drama television films
Films directed by Jon Avnet
1980s English-language films
1980s American films